Acts of the Martyrs (Latin Acta Martyrum) are accounts of the suffering and death of a Christian martyr or group of martyrs. These accounts were collected and used in church liturgies from early times, as attested by Saint Augustine.

These accounts vary in authenticity. The most reliable follow accounts from trials. Very few of these have survived. Perhaps the most reliable of these is the account of Saint Cyprian.
The account of Scillitan Martyrs is also based on trial records, though some claim it has been embellished with miraculous and apocryphal material.

A second category, the "Passiones," are based on eyewitness accounts. These include the martyrdoms of Saint Ignatius of Antioch, Saint Polycarp, the Martyrs of Lyons, the famous Acts of Perpetua and Felicitas, and the Passion of Saint Irenaeus. In these accounts, miraculous elements are restricted, a feature that proved unpopular. These accounts were often later embellished with legendary material.

A third category is accounts purported by some to be largely or purely legendary. The Acts of Saint Catherine of Alexandria and those of Saint George fall into this category.

Eusebius of Caesarea was likely the first Christian author to produce a collection of acts of the martyrs.

Besides these, there are romances, either written around a few real facts which have been preserved in popular or literary tradition, or else pure works of the imagination, containing no real facts whatever.  Still, as they were written with the intention of edifying and not deceiving the reader, a special class must be reserved for hagiographical forgeries. To this must be relegated all those Acts, Passions, Lives, Legends, and Translations which have been written with the express purpose of perverting history, such, for instance, as the legends and translations falsely attaching a saint's name to some special church or city.

Origins 
The expression Acta martyrum, in general applies to all narrative texts about the death of the martyrs; but it possesses a more precise and restricted meaning, when referring, in technical terms, to the official records of the processes and conviction. These official records were shorthands and were transcribed by the officials of the court chancery (notarius exceptor) to be preserve in its archives; because of this relationship with the court of the proconsul, they were also called "proconsulares" (Acta proconsularia). Once the distinction is made, the name of the act is reserved for the verbal processes (like, for example, Acta martyrum Scyllitanorum) while the references relating to the martyrs, the name of passio is applied, in all of its diverse form ( gesta, martyrium, legenda). Such a distinction is also justified by the different purpose and nature of both type of documents; the records are destitute of all hagiographic character, while the Passions are characterized by their purpose and edifying religious sense. Nonetheless, it is necessary to add that in the group of records is included some texts containing narrative parts alien to the verbal process, but of equal historical and documentary value (Acta-Passio SS. Perpetuae et Felicitatis, for example). 

In any case, the preserve records are small, of about a dozen fragments, so that most of the narrative texts about the martyrs are the Passions. The shortage of official records and direct documenting has been controversial. The old christian communities had a great interest in maintaining the memory of their martyrs, as it is proven by the news referenced in the story of martyrdom of Polycarp (m. 156), whose memory were venerated annually in Izmir. Cyprian use to recommend his clerics to take detailed note of the death of the martyrs; These valuable testimonies were also the oldest news about the cult of the martyrs. According to what is known to date, there is no precise idea of up to what degree christians use to transcribe the records of the processes; it is, undoubtedly, very likely that some of those who witnessed the development of stenography in their text, in the same manner as the notarius of the court, and they gave it to the community for preservation in the archives of the church. This hypothesis seems to be confirmed by the details and notes of the judge or the martyr and seem to interrupt the rigid protocol form. In the other hand, it did not prove easy for christian to obtain copies of the verbal processes that were saved in the proconsular archive, for which in occasion, large sums had to be paid.. No precedents have been preserved that allow us to know if the Church of Rome, which had organized a section of notaries, took the initiative of collecting the records of its martyrs, nor is the news that Julius Africanus did a similar task as far as Rome is concerned, trustworthy. The information about the other communities is still less certain.

Anyhow, the shortage of this type of documentation can be explained in part by the destruction ordered by Diocletian in the year 303 of the sacred books that existed in the churches and that would have affected the records equally. There are no traces suggesting that the churches got involved in restoring the heritage of the destroyed hagiographic texts after the persecution ended. The events of later centuries, such as the western Germanic invasions in the fifth (V) and sixth (VI) century, may have consummated the irreparable loss of the writings still preserved.

Division and classification 
Given the enormous number of hagiographic texts and the heterogeneous nature of their origin, authority and value, critics have proposed a classification to guide their study. It has been observed in the first place that a classification of the texts based on the criterion of the authenticity of the martyr or the legitimacy of his cult is not valid or useful. A classification based on extrinsic characteristics, such as the one that divides the hagiographic documents in Acta, Passiones, Vitae, Miracula, Translationes, etc., also lacks value, according to the object of the story. Neither does the classification meet the demands of criticism two large groups, contemporary documents and subsequent documents, since it does not express anything about the value of the document. The safest criterion is the one indicated by Hippolyte Delehaye, which is based on the degree of sincerity and historicity offered by the literary genre of the document.

According to this criterion, six groups of texts are established:

 They Understand the verbal processes contained in official relations preceding the proconsular archives or direct transcriptions, such as the S. Cypriani Act, for example.
 They group together accounts of eyewitnesses or trustworthy contemporaries, whether they are direct testimonies, testimonies of other people or of a mixed type, such as De martyribus Palaestinae by Eusebius of Cesarea.
 They contain narrations from which an information or document can be extracted from one of the two preceding groups such as the Menologion of Symeon Metaphrast.
 They cover all those stories that lack a historical basis, except for the name of the sepulcher, and the cult of the martyr like the Passio S. Felicitatis.
 They are made up of purely fantastic stories, authentic products of the imagination, such as the Passio S. Nicephori.
 They group narrations of legendary character that falsify the historical truth and can be defined as false.

If the elements that distinguish the six groups are considered, it is possible to verify that the first and the second refer to a uniform type of texts because of the contemporary and direct nature of the information; the next two contain stories, based in varying degrees, on at least partially secure data; the last two, on the other hand, are true fantasies without a historical basis.

Maintaining the same criteria as Delehaye, the texts can be classified into three simpler groups:

 The official records and the accounts of direct testimonies.
 Narratives based on documents belonging to the first group or, at least, on a certain number of safe historical elements.
 The novels or hagiographic fantasies.

Literary scheme 
Except for the records, all of the narrative documents mentioned above offer, from a literary point of view, common characters, since they are all the result of an elaboration and compositional process typical of hagiographic literature; the tendency to the schematic form has a remote origin, whose trace already manifested in ancient texts, close to the type and narrative sincerity, of the same record. This has happened, for example, in the Martyrium Polycarpi, in which it is possible to recognize the attempt of the hagiographer to assimilate the death of the martyr to that of Christ. This theme, of the martyr who imitates Christ, appears already in the first Christian writers. When subsequently, from the fourth century on, certain patterns or essential criteria are fixed, the hagiographers adopt certain narrative characteristics that become the literary genre of the passions.

In the first place the legal tone of the Roman criminal process of the first records has been preserved; sometimes even some of the passions make reference to it, showing how, on more than one occasion, the lost records served as sources. The introductory formula of the consular date of the records preserve the indication of the emperor, governor or proconsul, even in historically erroneous cases. The phases of the procedure, arrest, appearance, interrogation, torture, judgment and torment are preserve and constitute the structure of the narrative; likewise, the protagonists, usually few in number, of the ancient records are preserved: the martyr, the judge or magistrate and the executioner; in the second place, the Christian spectators who animate their companion and, finally, the hostile mass of the pagans. On a similar scheme, the evolutionary process of the passions develops (throughout the centuries IV to XX), with successive enrichments and formal improvements, including fantasies, common places and errors, due to both ignorance and blind piety of the hagiographers. These unsubstantiated relationships can be broken down like this:

 The apostle and even the small initial group of martyrs came to be united with topographically or liturgically close groups;
 The figure of the persecutor was typified in the cruelest of those known and traditionally considered as such: Decius, Valerian and Diocletian; and the same happened with the figure of the governor (praeses, proconsularis), who was often called Anulinus, historical figure of the fourth century. 
 The interrogation was prolonged in an inordinate way, often putting into the mouth of the martyr professions of faith imitating the theology of the time and the New Testament writings;
 The martyr was made to pronounce controversial discourses, plagiarizing the content of other works, generally of the apologetic writings, addressed to the pagans or against heresies.

The same happened with the narrations of the pains and tortures, prolonged and multiplied without saving prodigies made by the martyr, adorned with the spectacular element provided by fantasy and legend. In this transformation and development, negative from the critical point of view, several factors influenced to a considerable degree: the spread of the cult of the relics, with the inevitable abuses easily imaginable; veneration of the martyred saint, patron saint of the city, monastery or church, which obliged him to find or invent a living; the particularly religious and devout environment of the Middle Ages, favored by the monks who were among the most active writers of the hagiographic texts.

Compilation 
Dispensing from the first records collected, incomplete and that are already considered lost, it can be said that the first compiler was Eusebius of Cesarea, of whom the title of the writing of martyribus is known which unfortunately has been lost; On the other hand, Martyribus Palestinae is preserved. This was the only collection known in Rome during the sixth century, in the time of St. Gregory the Great, as the Pope himself informed the bishop and patriarch of Alexandria, Eulogio, who had requested documentation about the collections of gesta martyrum. Almost at the same time, great martyrology was forming, called jeronimiano with the commemorations of all the martyrs, which grouped the oldest martyrologies of the churches. This fact is important, because the compilation of many of the passions is intimately related to this martyrology, which served as a starting point. Later, parallel to the disclosure of the narratives of the gesta martyrum, there was the need to synthesize them in succinct stories, including them in the most known martyrologies at that time; those composed by Saint Bede the Venerable in the eighth century and Florus of Lyon, Atto and Usuard in the ninth century. These had at their disposal the data of the passions and adapted them to the liturgical commemoration of the calendar; some of them, especially Adón, had no critical concern and used the texts without evaluating them, confusing and distorting data and news. Because of such information, these medieval martyrologies were called historical martyrologies.

Something similar happened in the Eastern Church, where the numerous passions were collected in abbreviated form in the liturgical books, for example in the saints (menaea), in which was introduced for each day of the 12 months of the year an appointment about the life and martyrdom of the saint. The same happened with the menologies (menology), also divided into 12 volumes, corresponding to the 12 months of the year; in them the passions are synthesized in a more extensive way than in the preceding ones. We can not forget the menology of Symeon the Metaphrast (tenth century), who read and transcribed fragments of ancient passions, giving them a better literary form, for which he changed and adapted the various parts of the original (hence the name Metaphraste, from the Greek metaphrasis= change). The work has rendered a valuable service to the hagiography by saving various texts subsequently lost. During the Late Middle Ages, numerous collections of Lives of Saints, Passionists, Legendaries, etc. were made, which are still found in various codices of European libraries; others, on the other hand, were recast arbitrarily in other compilations later printed and translated in vulgar language; thus constituting a copious literature that reaches until the Renaissance.

Hagiographic critique 
The most arduous problem concerning the Acta martyrum is to determine its authenticity, the historical value that at least in part contain and often hide the numerous texts, whose analysis is far from being concluded. The first attempt to determine the authentic records is owed to the Benedictine Thierry Ruinart, who collected and published 117 texts that he considered genuine.  Its origin and value were not homogeneous, since only 74 numbers contained the text of the passions, while the rest were paragraphs and fragments taken from old Christian writers, like Eusebio, John Chrysostom, Basil and even Prudentius, of whose hymns had extracted paragraphs relative to the martyrs Hippolytus of Rome and Saint Lawrence. It is true that in most cases they are historical figures, but the selection of the texts was not carried out under a uniform or safe criterion, nor was it accompanied by a critical analysis. The Benedictine, who had a rather vague idea of the purpose of its collection, only intended to make known the oldest and most trustworthy document for each of the martyrs, with the intention of excluding falsified documents.

In 1882 Edmond-Frederic Le Blant had the idea to continue and complete the compilation of Ruinart and added another group of records, which he considered authentic by the adequacy of the narrative with the Roman legal phrases. The criterion of Le Blant is not firm and shows once again the complexity of the critical work aimed at establishing the authentic records; the various authentic acta martyrum lists, which other authors have sketched or compiled later do not represent the result of a rigorous and scientific analysis, but rather are insignificant retouchings of Ruinart's work

With much greater seriousness, although very slowly, they are occupied with these works according to an organic plan by the Bollandists. In recent years, a series of principles and norms of hagiographic criticism have been exposed in relation to the records by several specialists, such as, H. Achelis, J. Geffken, A. Harnack, in Germany; P. Allard, J. Leclercq, in France; the Jesuit F. Grossi-Gondi, Fr. Lanzoni and Pio Franchi de 'Cavalieri, in Italy. The most valuable contribution, however, is due to the bolandist H. Delehaye, from whose writings it would be possible to extract a critical summula. Ihe contributed, in effect, the safest classification of the records; He has pointed out the various components of a martyr's dossier, has reconstructed the iter of the legend, underlining the special function of the massa and local traditions; He has studied hagiographic documents parallel to the narrative texts, such as martyrologies and synaxes, and has established the different value of literary, liturgical and monumental sources, specifically establishing that of chronological and topographical data (doctrine of hagiographic coordinates). In summary, he has outlined and perfected the discipline of the method.
It has been said, with a certain air of reproach, that the hagiographic criticism has been interested until the present, almost exclusively in the problems related to the authenticity and chronology of the document, neglecting the social aspect and the environment in which it was written; aspect that in turn helps determine the same chronology. It has been insisted, therefore, on the need to "identify the cultural and religious concepts expressed in the document and establish a reference to the social environment where the text comes from and to which it is addressed" .

Notes 
1. for example Esteban (Hch 7, 54) or Antipas (Ap 2, 13).
2. Real Academia Española. Diccionario Usual, voz "mártir".
3. Cf. Martyrium Polycarpi 18.
4. Cf. Epistola 12, 2: <<dies quibus excedunt adnote>>;see also Epistola 39, 2.
5. Cf. Passio Probi, Tarachi et Andrinici,BHG 1574.
6. Cf. Passio S. Symphorosae, BHL 7971;Acta Sanctorumjul. IV, 355.
7. Cf. BHG 1331-1334.
8. Cf. Hans von Campenhause
9. CF. Victricius, De laude Sanctorum, 56.
10. Cf. Historia ecclesiastica V, proemio en PG, 408.
11. Cf. Hist. eccl., VII, apendice.
12. Cf. Gregorio I, Registrum epistolarumVIII,29.
13. Cf. Acta Primorum martyrum sincera,Paris 1689.

References

Bibliography 

 Acta Sanctorum (various editors)
 Aigrain R. (1953). L'hagiographie, ses sources, ses méthodes, son histoire. Paris. Bloud & Gay.
 BHG, 3 ed. Brussels 1957
 DACL 1, 373-446
 Delehaye H. (1934). Cinq leçons sur la méthode hagiographique. Brussels
 Delehaye H. (1933). Les origines du culte des martyrs, 2.ª ed. Brussels
 Delehaye H. (1955). Les légendes hagiographiques, 4.ª ed. Brussels
 Delehaye H. (1966). Les passions des martyrs et les genres littéraires, 2.ª ed. Brussels
 Delehaye H. (1927). Sanctus. Brussels.
 Gallina C. (1939). I martiri dei Primi Secoli. Florence.
 Gebhardt O.v. (1902). Acta martyrum selecta. Berlin A. Duncker.
 Grossi-Gondi F. (1919). Principi e problemi di critica agiografica. Rome.
 Knopf R. (1929). Ausgewählte Märtyrer Briefen, 3.ª ed. Tübingen.
 Pezzella S. (1965). Gli atti dei martiri. Introduzione a una storia dell'antica agiografia. Rome.
 Quasten J. (2004). Patrología I. BAC.
 Quenti H. (1908). Les martyrologes historiques au moyen Age. Paris. V. Lecoffre, J. Gabalda
 Ruinart T. (1659). Acta primorum martyrum sincera. Paris. Regensburg.
 Rütten F. (1955). Lateinische Märtyrerakten und Märtyrer Briefen, 3.ª ed. Münster
 Ruiz Bueno D. (1951). Actas de los mártires. Madrid. BAC.
 Schwerd A. (1960). Lateinische Märtyrerakten, Munich. BHL, 2, Brussels 1898-1901.

External links 

 Owen E.C.E (ed) (1927). Some Authentic Acts of the Early Martyrs. Oxford: Clarendon Press.

Attribution

Acts of the Apostles (genre)
Christian hagiography